Old Nubian (also called Middle Nubian or Old Nobiin) is an extinct Nubian language, attested in writing from the 8th to the 15th century AD. It is ancestral to modern-day Nobiin and closely related to Dongolawi and Kenzi. It was used throughout the kingdom of Makuria, including the eparchy of Nobatia. The language is preserved in more than a hundred pages of documents and inscriptions, both of a religious (homilies, prayers, hagiographies, psalms, lectionaries), and related to the state and private life (legal documents, letters), written using an adaptation of the Coptic alphabet.

History

The textual record of the Old Nubian language covers a timespan of several centuries and a geographical area that is considerably larger than the one in which the present-day Nile Nubian languages were spoken before the construction of the Aswan dams.® The northernmost attestation of the language is the monumental plaque for Saint George in the Wädi an-Natrün (WN) in Lower Egypt. the southernmost inscription of a Nubian-like language has been found in Soba, close to Khartoum (Soba), while toward the west an inscription has been found in Kordofan (Kordofan). However, both in geographical and linguistic terms, these texts are outliers. The great majority of the Old Nubian material derives from the Nubian "heartland' along the Nile between the Ist and 4th Cataract.
The earliest datable text in Old Nubian from Lower Nubia is a graffito from Es-Sebü' (gr 4) from 795 Ce.? while the oldest attestation from Upper Nubia is a Greek tombstone of Stephanos Eiñitta (Lajtar 1992, 112-129, no. 1) from
797 CE, containing several Old Nubian terms." The latest dated document is a letter on leather from Gebel Adda (Lajtar 2014a, 951) from 1483.' with much of the (mostly unpublished) material found in Gebel Adda dating to the same period. We thus have an attested period of seven centuries in which Old Nubian was used as language for written communication.
Old Nubian, according to historical linguists, was the spoken language of the oldest inhabitants of the Nile valley. Adams, Berhens, Griffith and Bechhause-Gerst agree that Nile Nubian has its origins in the Nile valley

Old Nubian is one of the oldest written African languages and appears to have been adopted from the 10th–11th century as the main language for the civil and religious administration of Makuria. Besides Old Nubian, Koine Greek was widely used, especially in religious contexts, while Coptic mainly predominates in funerary inscriptions. Over time, more and more Old Nubian began to appear in both secular and religious documents (including the Bible), while several grammatical aspects of Greek, including the case, agreement, gender, and tense morphology underwent significant erosion. The consecration documents found with the remains of archbishop Timotheos suggest, however, that Greek and Coptic continued to be used into the late 14th century, by which time Arabic was also in widespread use.

Writing

The script in which nearly all Old Nubian texts have been written is a slanted uncial variant of the Coptic alphabet, originating from the White Monastery in Sohag. The presence of these characters suggest that although the first written evidence of Old Nubian dates to the 8th century, the script must have already been developed in the 6th century, following the collapse of the Meroitic state. Additionally, Old Nubian used the variant  for the Coptic letter .

The characters  only appear in Greek loanwords. Gemination was indicated by writing double consonants; long vowels were usually not distinguished from short ones. In addition, Old Nubian featured a supralinear stroke, which could indicate:
 an /i/ preceding a consonant.

Modern Nobiin is a tonal language; if Old Nubian was tonal as well, the tones were not marked.

Punctuation marks included a high dot •, sometimes substituted by a double backslash \\, which was used roughly like an English period or colon; a slash /, which was used like a question mark; and a double slash //, which was sometimes used to separate verses.

In 2021, the first modern Nubian typeface based on the style of text written in old Nubian manuscripts called Sawarda was released designed by Hatim-Arbaab Eujayl for a series of educational books teaching Nobiin.

Grammar

Nouns
Old Nubian has no gender. The noun consists of a stem to which derivational suffixes may be added.  Plural markers, case markers, postpositions, and the determiner are added on the entire noun phrase, which may also comprise adjectives, possessors, and relative clauses.

Determination
Old Nubian has one definite determiner . The precise function of this morpheme has been a matter of controversy, with some scholars proposing it as nominative case or subjective marker. Both the distribution of the morpheme and comparative evidence from Meroitic, however, point to a use as determiner.

Case
Old Nubian has a nominative-accusative case system with four structural cases determining the core arguments in the sentence, as well as a number of lexical cases for adverbial phrases.

Number
"child." "Christians";  "dogs."

Pronouns
Old Nubian has several sets of pronouns and subject clitics are the following, of which the following are the main ones:

There are two demonstrative pronouns: , pl. "that." Interrogative words include  "who?";  "what?"; and a series of question words based on the root .

Verbs
The Old Nubian verbal system is by far the most complex part of its grammar, allowing for valency, tense, mood, aspect, person and pluractionality to be expressed on it through a variety of suffixes.

The main distinction between nominal and verbal predicates in a main clause versus a subordinate clause is indicated by the presence of the predicate marker . The major categories, listing from the root of the verb to the right, are as follows:

Valency

Pluractionality

Aspect

Tense

Person
This can be indicated by a three different series of subject clitics, which are obligatory only in certain grammatical contexts.

Sample text

 P.QI 1 4.ii.25 
 kit-ka gelgel-os-ou-an-non iēsousi mañan tri-ka dolle polgar-a pes-s-n-a pap-o iskel-im-m-e eik-ka
 stone-ACC roll-PFV-PST1-3PL-TOP Jesus eye.DU both-ACC high raise.CAUS-PRED speak-PST2-2/3/SG-PRED father-VOC thank-AFF-PRS-1SG.PRED you-ACC

"And when they rolled away the rock, Jesus raised his eyes high and said: Father, I thank you."

Notes

References

Other sources
 Browne, Gerald M., (1982) Griffith's Old Nubian Lectionary. Rome / Barcelona.
 Browne, Gerald M., (1988) Old Nubian Texts from Qasr Ibrim I (with J. M. Plumley), London, UK.
 Browne, Gerald M., (1989) Old Nubian Texts from Qasr Ibrim II. London, UK.
 Browne, Gerald M., (1996) Old Nubian dictionary. Corpus scriptorum Christianorum orientalium, vol. 562. Leuven: Peeters. .
 Browne, Gerald M., (1997) Old Nubian dictionary - appendices. Leuven: Peeters. .
 Browne, Gerald M., (2002) A grammar of Old Nubian.  Munich: LINCOM. .
 Griffith, F. Ll., (1913) The Nubian Texts of the Christian Period. ADAW 8. https://archive.org/details/nubiantextsofchr00grif
 Satzinger, Helmut, (1990) Relativsatz und Thematisierung im Altnubischen. Wiener Zeitschrift für die Kunde des Morgenlandes 80, 185–205.

External links
 Extended details on all the letters of the Old Nubian alphabet, especially the additional ones, can be found in this Unicode proposal by Michael Everson and Stephen Emmel.
 
 Old Nubian basic lexicon at the Global Lexicostatistical Database

Nubian languages
Nubian language, old
Nubian language, old
Writing systems of Africa
History of Sudan